Babez for Breakfast is the fifth studio album by Finnish rock band Lordi, released on 10 September 2010. As is traditional for the band, their costumes were renewed for the release of this album. The album was produced by Michael Wagener. It was the final album to feature both Kita and Awa before their departure from the band.

The first single, "This Is Heavy Metal", was released digitally on 9 August 2010, and physically a week later on 16 August. There were only an estimated 200 physical copies of the single made and it is seen as a rare collectors' item amongst Lordi fans.

A limited edition of the album, entitled The Breakfast Box includes bonus merchandise and was released on 18 October 2010.

Recording 
The recording of the album started on 16 February 2010 at WireWorld Studio in Nashville, Tennessee, United States. The band had 44 demos to choose from, of which 15 made the final cut.

Track list

Personnel 
Lordi
 Mr Lordi – vocals, artwork, art direction, layout
 Amen – guitars, backing vocals
 Kita – drums, backing vocals
 OX – bass
 Awa – keyboards

Additional musicians
 Bruce Kulick – guitars (6)
 Mark Slaughter – vocals (14)
 Julie Westlake – vocals (10)
 Ainsley Billings – vocals (14)
 Gracyn Billings – vocals (14)
 Clay Vann – voice (4), backing vocals
 Goldy Locks – voice (1)
 Ralph Ruiz – voice (1)
 Tracy Lipp – voice (1, 10), backing vocals
 Marija S. – vocals (10)
 Sarge – backing vocals
 Bryan Blumer – backing vocals
 Jeremy Rubolino – string arrangements (6)

Production
 Michael Wagener – production, recording, mixing
 Eric Conn – mastering
 Don Cobb – mastering
 Petri Haggrén – photography

Charts

References 

2010 albums
Lordi albums
The End Records albums